Rutuja Bagwe is an Indian actress and dancer. She mainly works in Marathi films and television industry. She made her big screen debut with Marathi film "Shaheed Bhai Kotwal". She is known for her lead role in Nanda Saukhya Bhare.

Early life 
Rutuja has completed her schooling from Parle Tilak Vidyalaya and Raigad Military School and she has done her graduation in B.Sc. Mathematics from Maharshi Dayanand Vidyalaya.

Filmography

Television

Films

Plays 

 Gochi Premachi (2008)
 Girgaon Via Dadar (2011)
 Silent Cream (2012)
 Ananyaa (2018-2019)

Awards and nominations

References

External links 
 Rutuja Bagwe on IMDb

Actresses in Marathi television
Actresses in Marathi cinema
Living people
Indian stage actresses
Year of birth missing (living people)